George Kendall is the name of:
 David George Kendall, British statistician noted for Second World War rocket research
 George H. Kendall, president of the New York Bank Note Company
 George Washington Kendall (aka George Kennedy), Canadian sports promoter
 George Wilkins Kendall (1809–1867), American war correspondent and sheep rancher; Kendall County, Texas is named for him
 George Kendall (Jamestown council member)
 George Kendall (theologian) (1610–1663), of Cofton, Devon

See also
 Sir Maurice George Kendall, British statistician
 Henry George Kendall, English sea captain
 George Kendall Sharp, American lawyer and federal judge